Polypodium calirhiza is a species of fern in the polypody family. Its common names include nested polypody and habit polypody. It is found in California and Oregon in the U.S., and several states of Mexico:  Colima, Jalisco, Mexico State, Oaxaca, and Veracruz.  The leaflets on each leaf are broad and oval-shaped, coming to a dull point. This fern is sometimes epiphytic.

The name of this species is a conflation of Polypodium californicum and Polypodium glycyrrhiza, because this species arose as a hybrid between those two species. It was not recognized as a separate species until 1991.

In the California Coast Ranges P. calirhiza occurs in a number of habitats including California oak woodlands and exposed rocky outcrops. In such oak woodlands it is often found in understory alliances with such species as the fern Pellaea andromedifolia and the fungus Tremella mesenterica.

References

External links
Polypodium calirhiza - Photo gallery

calirhiza
Ferns of the Americas
Ferns of the United States
Flora of Colima
Flora of Jalisco
Flora of the State of Mexico
Flora of Oaxaca
Flora of Veracruz
Ferns of California
Ferns of Mexico
Flora of Oregon
Flora of California
Flora of the Klamath Mountains
Natural history of the California Coast Ranges
Flora of the Sierra Nevada (United States)
Natural history of the California chaparral and woodlands
Natural history of the Central Valley (California)
Natural history of the San Francisco Bay Area
Plants described in 1991
Epiphytes